Luis Felipe Gallegos Leiva (born 3 December 1991) is a Chilean professional footballer who plays as a midfielder for Universidad de Chile.

Club career
In 2009, Gallegos was promoted to first-adult team and debuted during an unofficial friendly match against Argentinos Juniors. The incoming season, he officially debuted against O'Higgins in a 3–3 away draw. The following match he assisted to Diego Rivarola in the second goal of the 2–0 away win over Cobreloa. His first competitive goal came on 15 August 2010 against Everton de Viña del Mar in a 5–1 victory.

In mid-2012 Gallegos left the club and joined on loan to German second-tier side Union Berlin. After completing his loan spell, he moved to Spain’s Liga Adelante team Recreativo de Huelva in June 2013.

In June 2014, he joined Necaxa of the Liga MX.

In August 2021, he joined the Greek club OFI Crete, becoming the fourth Chilean to play for the club after Alejandro Hisis, Jaime Vera and Miguel Vargas.

International career
In 2011, he was part of the South American U-20 Championship, scoring three goals in seven matches.

On 7 November 2019, he got his first call up to the Chile national team for the friendly match against Peru. However, the match was canceled due to the players decided not to play as a supporting sign to the social movement in Chile.

Honours
Universidad de Chile
 Campeonato Nacional: 2011–A, 2011–C, 2012–A
 Copa Sudamericana: 2011

Necaxa
Ascenso MX: Clausura 2016
Copa MX: Clausura 2018
Supercopa MX: 2018

References

External links
 
  
 
 

1991 births
Living people
People from Copiapó
People from Copiapó Province
People from Atacama Region
Chilean footballers
Association football midfielders
Chile under-20 international footballers
Chile youth international footballers
Chilean Primera División players
Universidad de Chile footballers
Chilean expatriate footballers
Expatriate footballers in Germany
Chilean expatriate sportspeople in Germany
Chilean expatriates in Germany
2. Bundesliga players
Regionalliga players
1. FC Union Berlin players
Expatriate footballers in Spain
Chilean expatriate sportspeople in Spain
Segunda División players
Recreativo de Huelva players
Expatriate footballers in Mexico
Chilean expatriate sportspeople in Mexico
Chilean expatriates in Mexico
Club Necaxa footballers
Atlético San Luis footballers
Ascenso MX players
Liga MX players
Expatriate footballers in Greece
Chilean expatriate sportspeople in Greece
Chilean expatriates in Greece
Super League Greece players
OFI Crete F.C. players